Hida (written: 飛田, 飛弾 or 肥田) is a Japanese surname. Notable people with the surname include:

, Japanese mathematician
, Japanese handball player
, Japanese footballer
, Japanese physician
, Japanese speed skater

Japanese-language surnames